Bryson Michael Brigman (born June 19, 1995) is an American professional baseball shortstop in the Los Angeles Dodgers organization.

Amateur career
Brigman graduated from Valley Christian High School in San Jose, California in 2014. He was drafted by the Oakland Athletics in the 40th round of the 2014 Major League Baseball draft but did not sign and instead chose to enroll at the University of San Diego where he played college baseball for the San Diego Toreros. As a freshman at USD in 2015, he slashed .339/.395/.436 with two home runs and 28 RBIs in 55 games and was named the West Coast Conference Freshman of the Year. After the 2015 season, he played collegiate summer baseball with the Orleans Firebirds of the Cape Cod Baseball League. In 2016, as a sophomore, he missed nine games due to a sports hernia but still played in 47 games, hitting .372 with 22 RBIs and 17 stolen bases. After his sophomore year, he was drafted by the Seattle Mariners in the third round (87th overall) of the 2016 Major League Baseball draft. He signed for $700,000.

Professional career

Seattle Mariners
After signing, Brigman made his professional debut with the Everett AquaSox of the Class A Short Season Northwest League where he hit .260 with 19 RBIs and 17 stolen bases in 68 games. He spent 2017 with the Clinton LumberKings of the Class A Midwest League where he batted .235 with two home runs, 36 RBIs, and 16 stolen bases in 120 games and he began 2018 with the Modesto Nuts of the Class A-Advanced California League with whom he was named an All-Star.

Miami Marlins
On July 31, 2018, Brigman (along with international pool money) was traded to the Miami Marlins in exchange for Cameron Maybin. He was assigned to the Jupiter Hammerheads of the Class A-Advanced Florida State League and was promoted to the Jacksonville Jumbo Shrimp of the Class AA Southern League in late August. In 127 total games played between Modesto, Jupiter, and Jacksonville, he slashed .310/.370/.395 with three home runs, 49 RBIs, and 21 stolen bases. Brigman returned to Jacksonville to begin 2019, while also spending time with Jupiter during the year. Over 118 games between the two clubs, he slashed .253/.337/.326 with two home runs and 28 RBIs. He did not play a minor league game in 2020 due to the cancellation of the minor league season caused by the COVID-19 pandemic. For the 2021 season, he was assigned back to Jacksonville (now members of the Triple-A East) with whom he slashed .282/.361/.399 with five home runs, 33 RBIs, and 19 doubles over 104 games. He returned to Jacksonville for the 2022 season. Over 105 games, he slashed .251/.299/.369 with eight home runs and 38 RBIs. On November 10, he elected free agency.

Los Angeles Dodgers
On February 27, 2023, Brigman signed a minor league contract with the Los Angeles Dodgers.

References

External links

USD Toreros bio

Minor league baseball players
1995 births
Living people
Baseball shortstops
Baseball players from San Jose, California
Orleans Firebirds players
San Diego Toreros baseball players
Everett AquaSox players
Clinton LumberKings players
Modesto Nuts players
Jupiter Hammerheads players
Jacksonville Jumbo Shrimp players